Sport in Algeria dates back to antiquity. In the Aurès Mountains, people played games such as El Kherdba or El khergueba (a chess variant). Playing cards, checkers and chess games are part of Algerian culture. Horse racing (fantasia) and rifle shooting are among the recreational traditions of Algeria.

The first Algerian, Arab, and African gold medalist was Boughera El Ouafi in the marathon at the 1928 Olympics of Amsterdam. The second Algerian medalist was marathon runner Alain Mimoun, who won the marathon at the 1956 Summer Olympics in Melbourne.

The Ministry of Youth and Sports in Algeria manages sport-related activities.

Popular sports

Football

The most convenient and the most popular sport in Algeria is association football. During the Algerian War, the FLN football team (Le Onze de l'indépendance), consisting of players who later joined the National Liberation Front (FLN) (an Algerian independence movement), participated in several tournaments and sports events.

The Algerian Football Federation (AFF) is an association of Algerian football clubs that organizes national competitions and international matches for the Algeria national football team. The AFF organized the meetings of the Algeria Championship of football, a professional league of 16 clubs, the Algerian Cup, and is also a member of the Confederation of African Football. Notable Algerian players in the history of the sport include: Lakhdar Belloumi, Rachid Mekhloufi, Hassen Lalmas, Rabah Madjer, Salah Assad and Djamel Zidane.

The Algerian national team qualified for the FIFA World Cup in 1982, 1986, 2010 and most recently 2014. In 1982, the national team came close to progressing into the second round, but was eliminated after Germany beat Austria in the so-called "non-aggression pact of Gijón". In 2014 Algeria proceeded to the Round of 16 for the first time after finishing in second place in Group H. Additionally, several football clubs have won continental and international trophies, such as the clubs ES Sétif and JS Kabylia.

Handball

Handball is the second most popular spectator and participation sport in Algeria. Algeria's national handball team has seven titles at the Men's African Championship, four gold medals at the African Games and many other titles with many participations in the World Men's Handball Championship and in the Olympic Games. The national clubs are also strong and win many international titles.

Algeria, along with Tunisia, is one of the best African male handball teams. The men's national handball team has won several titles including in the African Championship in 1981, 1983, 1985, 1987, 1989, 1996 and 2014. The women's national handball team has also triumphed in the tournaments of the African Championship and the Pan Arab games.

Athletics

Algeria has a strong reputation in middle-distance running (800m, 1500m, 5000m); it has had many winners in the IAAF World Championships and gold medals in the Olympic Games. Several men and women have been champions in athletics since the 1990s including Noureddine Morceli, Hassiba Boulmerka, Nouria Mérah-Benida, and Taoufik Makhloufi — all specialists in middle-distance running.

Boxing

Algeria has had many African and world champions in boxing, and has won many medals in boxing at the Olympic Games. The country's boxing champions have included Mustapha Moussa, Mohamed Bouchiche, Mohamed Benguesmia, Loucif Hamani, and Hocine Soltani, the Olympic champion in Atlanta 1996.

Cycling

Notable cyclists from Algeria have included Abdelkader Merabet, Hichem Chaabane, Redouane Chabaane, Abdel Basset Hannachi, Azzedine Lagab, Eddy Lembo and Youcef Reguigui.

Martial arts

Algeria has had tens of thousands of Vovinam practitioners, some of whom competed in the World Championship of 2011 in Ho Chi Minh City. In judo, Amar Benikhlef and Ali Idir have won the African Judo Championships several times in their categories. Several women including Soraya Haddad and Salima Souakri have won medals at the African Championship of Nations of Women's Judo and at the Olympic Games.

Volleyball

Algeria's volleyball team qualified to the 2010 FIVB Volleyball Men's World Championship. They have won titles in several international competitions in the past.

Basketball

Basketball is another important sport in Algeria; however, the country has won few international titles.

Other sports

Freestyle swimmer and African and Arabic champion Salim Iles competed in the 2004 Olympics.

Another growing sport in Algeria is rugby union. The Algeria national rugby team played their first official game on 18 December 2015 since the creation of the Algerian Rugby Federation. The match was played against the Tunisian rugby union team, to which they won 16–6. This was also the first international match played on Algerian soil (Oran), which was televised on the Algerian channel Canal Algérie in the country for the first time.

Ice Hockey in Algeria is governed by Hockey Algeria who became members of the IIHF in 2019.

Major sport events hosted
 1960 World Military Cup (French Algeria)
 1975 Mediterranean Games
 1978 All-Africa Games
 1990 African Cup of Nations
 2004 Pan Arab Games
 2005 Volleyball U19 World Championship
 World Cup Vovinam VietVoDao 2006
 2007 All-Africa Games
 Vovinam World Championship 2015
 2022 Mediterranean Games
 2022 Vocotruyen World Championship
 2022 African Nations Championship

Best athletes of the year
Below the list of the Best Awards sounding of athletes of the year organized by the Algeria Press Service (APS) since 1977, in collaboration with the national press.

Best athletes of the year
Below the list of the Best Awards sounding of athletes of the year organized by the Al Fadjr since 2020, in collaboration with the national press.

See also
Rugby union in Algeria
Marathon des Dunes
Algeria national rugby union team
Algerian Rugby Federation

References

External links
 Official website of the Ministry of Youth and Sport